Taos Pueblo (or Pueblo de Taos) is an ancient pueblo belonging to a Taos-speaking (Tiwa) Native American tribe of Puebloan people. The pueblos are considered to be one of the oldest continuously inhabited communities in the United States. This has been designated a UNESCO World Heritage Site.

Taos Pueblo is a member of the Eight Northern Pueblos. Natives will almost never speak of their religious customs to outsiders, and, because their language has never been written down, much of the culture remains unknown to the rest of the world.

Setting
The pueblo was constructed in a setting backed by the Taos Mountains of the Sangre de Cristo Range. The settlement was built on either side of Rio Pueblo de Taos, also called Rio Pueblo and Red Willow Creek, a small stream that flows through the middle of the pueblo compound. Its headwaters come from Blue Lake, or Ba Whyea, in the nearby mountains.

Taos Pueblo's most prominent architectural feature is a multi-storied residential complex of reddish-brown adobe, built on either side of the Rio Pueblo. The Pueblo's website states it was probably built between 1000 and 1450.

The pueblo was designated a National Historic Landmark on October 9, 1960. In 1992 it was designated as a UNESCO Heritage Site.  about 150 people live in the historical pueblo full-time.

Name

Taos language
In the Tanoan language of Taos (Northern Tiwa), the pueblo is referred to as "the village" in either tə̂otho "in the village" (tə̂o- "village" + -tho "in") or tə̂obo "to/toward the village" (tə̂o- "village" + -bo "to, toward"). The proper name of the pueblo is ȉałopháymųp’ȍhə́othə̀olbo "at red willow canyon mouth" (or ȉałopháybo "at the red willows" for short). This name is more commonly used in ceremonial contexts and is less common in everyday speech.

Spanish language
The name Taos in English was borrowed from Spanish Taos. Spanish Taos is probably a borrowing of Taos tə̂o- "village" which was heard as tao to which the plural -s was added although in the modern language Taos is no longer a plural noun. The idea that the Spanish Taos is from tao, "cross of the order of San Juan de los Caballeros" (from Greek tau), is unlikely.

History

Pre-Columbian
It is most likely that the Taos Indigenous people, along with other Pueblo Indigenous people, settled along the Rio Grande after migrating south from the Four Corners region. The dwellings of that region were inhabited by the Ancestral Puebloans. A long drought in the area in the late 13th century may have caused them to move to the Rio Grande, where the water supply was more dependable. However, their reason for migrating is still disputed and there is evidence that a violent struggle took place. Ultimately, archeological clues point to the idea that the Natives may have been forced to leave.

Throughout its early years, Taos Pueblo was a central point of trade between the native populations along the Rio Grande and their Plains Tribes neighbors to the northeast. Taos Pueblo hosted a trade fair each fall after the agricultural harvest.

Post-contact
The first Spanish conquistadors ("conquerors") to Taos Pueblo arrived in 1540; they were members of the Francisco Vásquez de Coronado expedition, which stopped at many of New Mexico's pueblos in search of the rumored Seven Cities of Gold. Around 1620, Spanish Jesuits oversaw construction of the first Catholic Church in the pueblo, the mission of San Geronimo de Taos. Reports from the period indicate that the native people of Taos resisted the building of the church and forceful imposition of the Catholic religion. Throughout the 1600s, cultural tensions grew between the native populations of the Southwest and the increasing Spanish colonial presence. Taos Pueblo was no exception. By 1660, the native people killed the resident priest and destroyed the church. The Spanish replied brutally. Several years after it was rebuilt, the Pueblo Revolt of 1680 began.

Taos Mountain

The Pueblo's  of mountain land was taken by President Theodore Roosevelt and designated as the Carson National Forest early in the 20th century. It was finally returned in 1970 by the United States when President Nixon signed Public Law 91-550.

Blue Lake
Blue Lake, which the people of the Pueblo consider sacred, was included in this return of Taos land. The Pueblo notably involved non-native people in lobbying the federal government for the return of Blue Lake, as they argued that their unrestricted access to the lake and the surrounding region was necessary to ensure their religious freedom. The Pueblo's web site names the reacquisition of the sacred Blue Lake as the most important event in its history due to the spiritual belief that the Taos people originated from the lake. It is believed that their ancestors live there, and the Pueblos themselves only ascend the mountain twice a year.

Architecture

At the time of the Spaniards' initial contact, Hernando de Alvarado described the pueblo as having adobe houses built very close together and stacked five or six stories high. The homes became narrower as they rose, with the roofs of each level providing the floors and terraces for those above.

The buildings at Taos originally had few windows and no standard doorways. Instead, access to rooms was through square holes in the roof that the people reached by climbing long, wooden ladders. Engelmann Spruce logs (or vigas) supported roofs that had layers of branches, grass, mud, and plaster covering them. The architecture and the building materials were well suited for the rigors of the environment and the needs of the people in the Taos Valley. 

The first Spanish-influenced architecture appeared in Taos Pueblo after Fray Francisco de Zamora came there in 1598 to establish a mission, under orders from Spanish Governor, Don Juan de Oñate.

Main structure

The north-side Pueblo is said to be one of the most photographed and painted buildings in North America. It is the largest multistoried Pueblo structure still existing. It is made of adobe walls that are often several feet thick. Its primary purpose was for defense. Up to as late as 1900, access to the rooms on lower floors was by ladders on the outside to the roof, and then down an inside ladder. In case of an attack, outside ladders could easily be pulled up.

Homes
The homes in this structure usually consist of two rooms, one of which is for general living and sleeping, and the second of which is for cooking, eating, and storage. Each home is self-contained; there are no passageways between the houses. Taos Indians made little use of furniture in the past, but today they have tables, chairs, and beds. In the pueblo, electricity, running water, and indoor plumbing are prohibited.

Spiritual community

Religious practices
Two spiritual practices are represented in the Pueblo: the original indigenous spiritual and religious tradition and Roman Catholicism. The majority of Taos Indians practice their still-vital, ancient indigenous religion. Most (90%) members of the Taos Pueblo community are baptized as Roman Catholics. Saint Jerome, or San Geronimo, is the patron saint of the pueblo.

Culture

Traditions Involving the Land 
Since Spanish colonization, the native Taos people have resisted cultural change and influence with European ideas. Many ethnographers observe a high level of "interconnectedness and mutual dependence" between the Taos Pueblo and their surrounding land, where they derive many of their cultural traditions. Consequently, a historical rivalry exists between the people on the South side of the river (summer people) and the North side (winter people). Foot races, which have significant religious meaning in the tribe, are a common way for these two groups to express their rivalry, and there is a long held tradition in their tribe that was possibly created before the pyramids. In addition, the Taos Pueblo attribute great value to Blue Lake in regards to their "living culture and agricultural sustainability."

Death Traditions 
According to Wood, the Taos Pueblo people never turn strangers away from their doors because they value both courtesy and hospitality. However, on All Souls' Day, the Taos Pueblo spend a day with their families and close their village to any non-Indian. The Taos Pueblo approach death with an air of "stoicism," and they are only allowed to visit cemeteries on All Souls' Day or the day of someone's burial.

Gender 
In the cultural fabric of the Taos Pueblo, the ethnographic data suggests that women are considered to be subordinate to men. The Pueblo social structure is dictated by kiva memberships, and women are not allowed to take part in the rituals held in these sacred spaces because they "are not trained" to do so. Despite the exclusion of women from some spiritual activities, the women in the Taos Pueblo society "exercised a considerable degree of influence economically, politically, and interpersonally." For example, single women can run their own households, and married women control their own finances because they traditionally work as cooks or maids. Additionally, women have informal decision making power, using their abilities to influence the men around them.

Conservation 
In 2011, the Taos Pueblo Preservation Program received a $800,000 grant from the U.S. Department of Housing and Urban Development. The fund aims to hire more workers, especially those who are trained in traditional construction techniques for conservation work, as well as workshop assistants who help pueblo homeowners with maintenance of traditional adobe homes. Supervisors teach trainees about traditional construction methods while rebuilding the majority of an 11-unit house which was in a state of near-collapse.

The first phase of the conservation of Taos Pueblo is the construction of the training center, restoration of 120–150 houses, training of the local people in the community, creation of a detailed assessment of the structure of the compound, and establishment of a cultural center and tribal archives. The second phase was financed by the World Monument Fund. It's listed on its watchlist because of its endangered nature, both culturally and structurally. By the end of the conservation efforts, twenty-one adobe houses are expected to be restored. The previous fund has also covered the cost of a laser scanning of the structures.

The main characteristics of the conservation of Taos Pueblo aim to encourage a community-based approach. They include the training of local people to manage their own property, as well as the establishment of partnerships with government and non-government entities. The project resolves to preserve the traditional way of life in the community and sustain cultural traditions.

In August of 2020, the United States Department of Housing and Urban Development announced a grant of $899,754 awarded to the Taos Pueblo Housing Authority to rehabilitate five housing units to help reduce the risk of transmitting COVID-19. The grant will also be used to provide rental, food, and utility assistance.

See also

Elk-Foot of the Taos Tribe
National Register of Historic Places listings in Taos County, New Mexico
List of National Historic Landmarks in New Mexico
List of the oldest buildings in New Mexico

Notes

References

Further reading

External links

Indianpueblo.org—Indian Pueblo Cultural Center: Taos Pueblo
unesco.org: Taos Pueblo — UNESCO World Heritage Centre.
 Sacredland.org: Taos Blue Lake
Princeton.edu: Taos Blue Lake Collection — at the Seeley G. Mudd Manuscript Library, Princeton University.
 National Park Service—NPS: Taos Pueblo — on NPS "Discover Our Shared Heritage" website''.
SMU-in-Taos: Research Publications digital collection — SMU-in-Taos (Fort Burgwin) campus; anthropological + archaeological monographs + edited volumes.
SMU-in-Taos: Taos archeology
SMU-in-Taos: Papers on Taos archaeology

 
Adobe buildings and structures in New Mexico
American Indian reservations in New Mexico
Buildings and structures completed in the 10th century
Buildings and structures in Taos County, New Mexico
Pueblo, Taos
National Historic Landmarks in New Mexico
Historic districts on the National Register of Historic Places in New Mexico
Native American tribes in New Mexico
Northern Rio Grande National Heritage Area
Populated places in Taos County, New Mexico
Pre-historic cities in the United States
Properties of religious function on the National Register of Historic Places in New Mexico
Pueblo great houses
Puebloan buildings and structures
Religious places of the indigenous peoples of North America
Sacred lakes
Pueblo
Tiwa Puebloans
Tourist attractions in Taos County, New Mexico
World Heritage Sites in the United States
National Register of Historic Places in Taos County, New Mexico
Pueblos on the National Register of Historic Places in New Mexico
Taos Revolt

de:Taos (Volk)
nv:Tówoł
hr:Taos
jv:Taos Puenlo